Pink Floyd were an English rock band who recorded material for fifteen studio albums, three soundtrack albums, three live albums, eight compilation albums, four box sets, as well as material that, to this day, remains unreleased during their five decade career.

There are currently 218 songs on this list.

Songs

See also
Pink Floyd discography
List of unreleased songs recorded by Pink Floyd
List of songs recorded by Syd Barrett

Notes

References

Bibliography
 

 
Pink Floyd
Pink Floyd